Pascal Debacker (born 8 April 1960) is a French middle-distance runner. He competed in the men's 3000 metres steeplechase at the 1984 Summer Olympics.

References

1960 births
Living people
Athletes (track and field) at the 1984 Summer Olympics
French male middle-distance runners
French male steeplechase runners
Olympic athletes of France
Place of birth missing (living people)